Bweni  is an administrative ward in Pangani District of Tanga Region in Tanzania. According to the 2012 census, the ward has a total population of 1,263.

See also
 List of Swahili settlements of the East African coast

References

Wards of Pangani District
Wards of Tanga Region
Archaeological sites in Tanzania
Archaeological sites of Eastern Africa